The 1965 Lamar Tech Cardinals football team represented Lamar State College of Technology—now known as Lamar University—as a member of the Southland Conference during the 1965 NCAA College Division football season. Led by third-year head coach Vernon Glass, the Cardinals compiled an overall record of 6–4 with a mark of 3–1 in conference play, winning the Southland title. Lamar Tech played home games at Cardinal Stadium in Beaumont, Texas.

Schedule

References

Lamar
Lamar Cardinals football seasons
Southland Conference football champion seasons
Lamar Tech Cardinals football